Senator Harris may refer to:

Members of the United States Senate
Fred R. Harris (born 1930), U.S. Senator from Oklahoma from 1964 to 1973
Ira Harris (1802–1875), U.S. Senator from New York from 1861 to 1867
Isham G. Harris (1818–1897), U.S. Senator of Tennessee from 1877 to 1897
John S. Harris (1825–1906), U.S. Senator from Louisiana from 1868 to 1871
Kamala Harris (born 1964), U.S. Senator from California from 2017 to 2021
William Alexander Harris (Kansas politician) (1841–1909), U.S. Senator from Kansas from 1897 to 1903
William J. Harris (1868–1932), U.S. Senator from Georgia from 1919 to 1932

United States state senate members
Addison C. Harris (1840–1916), Indiana State Senate
Andrew L. Harris (1835–1915), Ohio State Senate
Andy Harris (politician) (born 1957), Maryland State Senate
Becky Harris (born 1968), Nevada State Senate
Benjamin W. Harris (1823–1907), Massachusetts State Senate
Bill Harris (Ohio politician) (1934–2017), Ohio State Senate
Broughton Harris (1822–1899), Vermont State Senate
Charles L. Harris (general) (1834–1910), Nebraska State Senate
Chris Harris (Texas politician) (1948–2015), Texas State Senate
Dallas Harris (fl. 2010s), Nevada State Senate
Ernie Harris (politician) (born 1947), Kentucky State Senate
Fred Harris (lawyer) (1910–1979), Texas State Senate
Hamilton Harris (1820–1900), New York State Senate
James Harris (North Carolina politician) (1832–1891), North Carolina State Senate
Jeptha Vining Harris (Mississippi general) (1816–1899), Mississippi State Senate
John P. Harris (died 1926), Pennsylvania State Senate
John Harris (Wisconsin politician) (1856–1933), Wisconsin State Senate
Jonathan Harris (politician) (born 1964), Connecticut State Senate
Joseph Harris (Wisconsin politician) (1813–1889), Wisconsin State Senate
Kenneth R. Harris (1935–2009), North Carolina State Senate
Lee Harris (politician) (born 1978), Tennessee State Senate
Mark Harris (Idaho politician) (fl. 2010s), Idaho State Senate
Mark Harris (Maine politician) (1779–1843), Maine State Senate
Merrill W. Harris (1894–1967), Vermont State Senate
Napoleon Harris (born 1979), Illinois State Senate
Nathaniel Edwin Harris (1846–1929), Georgia State Senate
Sampson Willis Harris (1809–1857), Alabama State Senate
William C. Harris (Illinois politician) (1921–2004), Illinois State Senate